List of Guggenheim Fellowships awarded in 2014: Guggenheim Fellowships have been awarded annually since 1925, by the John Simon Guggenheim Memorial Foundation to those "who have demonstrated exceptional capacity for productive scholarship or exceptional creative ability in the arts."

References

2014
2014 awards
2014 art awards